James Peter Lorentz, Jr. (born May 1, 1947) is a Canadian retired professional ice hockey centre who played 10 seasons in the National Hockey League for the Boston Bruins, St. Louis Blues, New York Rangers and Buffalo Sabres between 1969 and 1978. He won the Stanley Cup with Boston in 1970. He was the color analyst for the Sabres on the MSG Network and the Sabres Radio Network. He worked alongside play-by-play commentator Rick Jeanneret.

Career
Lorentz's career started in 1964 when he played the first of three years of junior hockey with the Niagara Falls Flyers, which was part of the Ontario Hockey Association. He began his professional hockey career with the Oklahoma City Blazers of Central Hockey League in 1967-68. Lorentz was named rookie of the year in his first season with the CHL. In his second and final season in the minor leagues, he led the league in scoring and was named as the Most Valuable Player.

Lorentz left the CHL and went to play for the Boston Bruins, which were a powerhouse in the NHL, led by Bobby Orr and Phil Esposito. Lorentz scored his first NHL goal in Boston's 4-0 home win against Pittsburgh on March 2, 1969.  Lorentz did not play much that season, and was shuffled around from center ice and to the wing. In his rookie season with the Bruins, Lorentz won the Stanley Cup in the 1970 Stanley Cup Finals.  After the Cup, the Bruins traded Lorentz to the St. Louis Blues in exchange for the Blues' first pick in the 1970 Amateur Draft (the pick was used to select Ron Plumb).

Jim played the 1970-71 season with St. Louis before splitting the 1971-72 season between the Blues, the New York Rangers and the Buffalo Sabres. Over his more than six seasons with the Sabres, Jim racked up 134 goals, 197 assists and 331 points in 487 games. Jim also enjoyed his best seasons in a Sabre uniform, recording a career-high 27 goals in 1972-73 season and a personal-best 70 points in 1974-75 season, the same year he helped Buffalo reach the Stanley Cup Finals. In 1975, during game three of the 1975 Stanley Cup Finals against the Philadelphia Flyers at the Memorial Auditorium, Lorentz earned the nickname "Batman" when he swatted a bat out of mid-air with his stick. During the 1975 finals, Lorentz scored 6 goals and 10 points in 16 playoff games. Lorentz continued to play until 1978 when he retired from NHL duty. He retired with 659 games, 161 goals, 238 assists and 399 points.

After he stopped playing hockey with the Sabres, Lorentz served as the play by play announcer for the Sabres. He filled in for Ted Darling from October 16, 1991 to November 20, 1991 when Darling was on medical leave. He also filled in for Sabres play-by-play announcer Rick Jeanneret twice.

Retirement
On September 25, 2007, he announced his retirement from his position as color commentator for the Sabres after 26 years as a broadcaster with the team. The official statement was as follows: "My long association with the Buffalo Sabres was nothing but positive and I was fortunate to retire from the game as a player but be able to stay involved as a broadcaster," said Jim Lorentz. "I was blessed to work with two of the best play-by-play men of all-time in Ted Darling and Rick Jeanneret. This was a tough decision to make, but after 43 years of travel as a player and broadcaster, I based my decision on the unwillingness to tackle another long season and grueling travel schedule." Lorentz later stated that, if he had been given the same opportunity as Jeanneret later got to reduce his workload to only home games, he would have stayed on with the team.

In late 2015, Lorentz decided to return to Western New York to coach the Hamburg Hawks youth hockey team.

Buffalo Sabres Hall of Fame
Lorentz was inducted to the Buffalo Sabres hall of fame on February 9, 2010.  During the first intermission, Lorentz told the viewers that he is currently working on a full book about salmon fishing and is also an avid fisherman during his retirement from broadcasting. As of March 2014, Lorentz stated the book was nearly complete.  The Atlantic Salmon: Moody & Mysterious was published in 2017.

Career statistics

Regular season and playoffs

See also
 List of Buffalo Sabres broadcasters

References

External links
 

1947 births
Living people
Boston Bruins players
Buffalo Sabres announcers
Buffalo Sabres players
Canadian ice hockey centres
Ice hockey people from Ontario
National Hockey League broadcasters
Niagara Falls Flyers players
New York Rangers players
Oklahoma City Blazers (1965–1977) players
Sportspeople from Waterloo, Ontario
St. Louis Blues players
Stanley Cup champions